Desire Montgomery Butler (born 5 January 1967) is a former association football and cricket player from British Virgin Islands (BVI). In football, he played as a goalkeeper for Islanders FC and for the BVI national team. In cricket he played as a left-handed batsman and wicket-keeper for the BVI national team.

Cricket
The BVI were invited to take part in the 2006 Stanford 20/20, whose matches held official Twenty20 status. Butler made a single appearance in the tournament against Saint Lucia in a preliminary round defeat, with him ending the British Virgin Islands innings of 105/9 unbeaten without scoring.

Football
Butler played in both BVI qualifying matches for the FIFA World Cups of 2002, 2006, and 2010. He was captain of the BVI side in the 2008 Caribbean Cup qualification match against St Kitts and Nevis.

Career Statistics

International

References

External links
 
Desire Butler at ESPNcricinfo
Desire Butler at CricketArchive

1967 births
Living people
Association football goalkeepers
British Virgin Islands footballers
British Virgin Islands international footballers
British Virgin Islands cricketers
Wicket-keepers
Islanders FC players